The Creative Music File (CMF) is a synthesised music file format, similar to MIDI, designed by Creative Labs for use with their Sound Blaster cards.  The format actually stores its song data in MIDI format but it differs in that while General MIDI instruments are standardised, CMF instruments' data are stored in the file itself, much like MOD files.  This allows a large range of instruments to be used, and unlike MIDI the song should sound the same regardless of which synthesiser it is played through.  While MOD files store their instruments as digital data ("samples"), CMF instruments are stored as a set of register values that can be programmed into the OPL chips that were part of all early Sound Blaster cards (a feature that made them compatible with competing Adlib cards at the time.)

Because CMF music is played through these OPL chips, it has a distinctly synthesised sound.  However, in the early 1990s when the format first came out this allowed songs to be synthesised entirely in hardware, meaning the performance impact of using CMF music was very low.  For this reason the music in a number of games from this era (such as Kiloblaster and Jill of the Jungle) was in CMF format.

Technical specifications

The CMF format uses the  filename extension.  Files can be identified by the file signature in the first four bytes, which will be the ASCII characters "CTMF" (Creative Technology Music File) if the file is in CMF format.

The instruments inside a CMF file are stored in an identical manner to that used in SBI files (Sound Blaster Instrument), minus the SBI header.  The music block is in standard MIDI format, allowing for easy conversion between .mid and .cmf files.  The CMF format also assigned a new meaning to a handful of MIDI controllers, so they could be used to change different aspects of playback (such as switching between the OPL's 9-channel FM synthesis mode and its alternate 6-channel + 5-percussion "rhythm mode" synthesis).

External links
 The CMF format article on the Game Modding Wiki has a detailed description of the CMF file format.
 The CMF article at the Video Game Music Preservation Foundation Wiki provides some further links to tools to play, convert (to and from), edit, and extract CMF files, and a list of game titles that employed the format.
Video game music file formats
Music notation file formats